National Petroleum Council may refer to:

 National Petroleum Council (US)
 National Petroleum Council (Brazil)